Modorobo is a rural locality (a village) in Gaynskoye Rural Settlement, Gaynsky District, Perm Krai, Russia. The population was 6 as of 2010.

Geography 
Modorobo is located 9 km south of Gayny (the district's administrative centre) by road. Danilovo is the nearest rural locality.

References 

Rural localities in Gaynsky District